Kid Sam are a Melbourne-based duo consisting of cousins Kieran (vocals & guitar) and Kishore Ryan (drums). The band's first performance was in January 2006, and they started getting airplay on Triple J's "unearthed" program in 2008. Their debut self-titled album was released in 2009 to positive reviews and they went on their first national headline tour in 2010. Kid Sam were nominated for a J Award and the Australian Music Prize. Their final live performance was in August 2010 in Melbourne supporting Grizzly Bear and Here We Go Magic at the Palais Theatre in Melbourne. Both cousins moved on to other projects, with Kishore drumming for bands such as Seagull, Otouto and Where Were You At Lunch since then. Kieran Ryan spent 2011-12 recording a self-titled solo album, which was released in 2013. The duo played a one-off show at their record label's party in April 2015.

In October 2022, the band posted to their long-dormant Facebook page about a "12 year reunion" show alongside Carla dal Forno at the Bridge Hotel in Castlemaine, with a promise of more to come if it "goes well".

Discography
Kid Sam / Psuche - Tell Tell / We're Mostly Made Of Water (2008, split single) - Two Bright Lakes
Kid Sam (2009) - Two Bright Lakes

Awards and nominations

Australian Music Prize
The Australian Music Prize (the AMP) is an annual award of $30,000 given to an Australian band or solo artist in recognition of the merit of an album released during the year of award. The commenced in 2005.

|-
| 2009
|Kid Sam
| Australian Music Prize
| 
|-

J Award
The J Awards are an annual series of Australian music awards that were established by the Australian Broadcasting Corporation's youth-focused radio station Triple J. They commenced in 2005.

|-
| J Awards of 2009
| Kid Sam
| Australian Album of the Year
|

References

Victoria (Australia) musical groups
Australian indie rock musicians